Laimosemion is a genus of fish in the family Rivulidae from the Amazon basin and basins in the Guiana Shield in tropical South America.

Like their relatives, the adult Laimosemion often inhabit very small isolated waters, but they are not annual species like some other killifish. The adults can move some distance over land to find another water source. They do this by repeatedly flipping their body. They commonly complete their life cycle in the water, often laying their eggs among plant material. However, their eggs can survive several days of drought, only hatching when again covered by water.

Species
Until 2011, Laimosemion were included in Rivulus, and some prefer to maintain them in that genus.

If recognized as a valid genus, there are currently 29 species in Laimosemion:

 Laimosemion agilae (Hoedeman, 1954)
 Laimosemion altivelis (Huber, 1992)
 Laimosemion amanapira (W. J. E. M. Costa, 2004)
 Laimosemion anitae Dalton Tavares Bressane Nielsen, Jan Willem Hoetmer and Eric Vandekerkhove, 
 Laimosemion breviceps (C. H. Eigenmann, 1909)
 Laimosemion cladophorus (Huber, 1991)
 Laimosemion dibaphus (G. S. Myers, 1927)
 Laimosemion frenatus (C. H. Eigenmann, 1912)
 Laimosemion geayi (Vaillant, 1899)
 Laimosemion gransabanae (Lasso A., Taphorn & Thomerson, 1992)
 Laimosemion jauaperi W. J. E. M. Costa & Bragança, 2013
 Laimosemion kirovskyi (W. J. E. M. Costa, 2004)
 Laimosemion leticia Valdesalici, 2016
 Laimosemion lyricauda (Thomerson, Berkenkamp & Taphorn, 1991)
 Laimosemion mabura Valdesalici & García-Gil, 2015
 Laimosemion mahdiaensis (Suijker & Collier, 2006)
 Laimosemion nicoi (Thomerson & Taphorn, 1992)
 Laimosemion paryagi Vermeulen, Suijker & Collier, 2012 (Paryag's killifish)
 Laimosemion rectocaudatus (Fels & de Rham, 1981)
 Laimosemion romeri (W. J. E. M. Costa, 2003)
 Laimosemion sape (Lasso-Alcalá, Taphorn, Lasso A. & León-Mata, 2006)
 Laimosemion staecki (I. Schindler & Valdesalici, 2011)
 Laimosemion strigatus (Regan, 1912)
 Laimosemion tecminae (Thomerson, Nico & Taphorn, 1992)
 Laimosemion tomasi (Vermeulen, Valdesalici & Garcia-Gil, 2013)
 Laimosemion torrenticola (Vermeulen & Isbrücker, 2000)
 Laimosemion uakti (W. J. E. M. Costa, 2004)
 Laimosemion uatuman (W. J. E. M. Costa, 2004)
 Laimosemion ubim W. J. E. M. Costa & Lazzarotto, 2014
 Laimosemion xiphidius (Huber, 1979)

References

Rivulidae
Freshwater fish genera